Guizhou Minzu University ( is a provincial public university located in Guiyang, capital of Guizhou province, China.

History 
The university was established in 1951 as the earliest university to cater for indigenous people such as the Zhuang people which populate Guizhou province. In April 2014, it renamed Guizhou Minzu University.

References

External links 
 

Education in Guizhou
Universities and colleges in Guizhou
Educational institutions established in 1951
1951 establishments in China
Minzu Universities